In veterinary medicine, miliary dermatitis is a multifocal distribution of skin lesions, with no identifiable pattern. The term miliary means millet-like, as the papules on the coat of an affected cat feel similar to millet seeds.

Causes
Miliary dermatitis is classified as a cutaneous reaction pattern of inflammation and can be the manifestation of a wide variety of skin allergies, infections or parasitic infestations. The majority of cases are associated with feline flea allergy dermatitis.

Clinical Signs
Cats with miliary dermatitis have a rash consisting of fine papules surmounted by small crusts. Although most are unaffected by rash, where noticed a broad rash can be concentrated to the back of the neck, scapular (shoulder blade) and surrounding areas, and/or the lower abdomen and surrounding areas. Secondary infection with Staphylococcus intermedius is common. Signs include itchiness, "elevated grooming", and visible spots of fur-loss.

Treatment
The basis of the treatment is identification and management of the underlying cause. Cats may also be treated with antibiotics and cortisone drugs. The disease may be chronic and recurrent.

See also
 Cat skin disorders

References 

Cat diseases